Wedo, WEDO or WeDo may refer to:
 Edo, the former name of Tokyo, Japan
 WEDO, a radio station in Pittsburgh, Pennsylvania, United States
 WEDO, West–Eastern Divan Orchestra 
 Women's Environment & Development Organization
 WeDo, an educational robotics set by Lego
 WEDO, a Development Joint Stock Company (WEDO ARCHITECTURE & CONSTRUCTION) in Viet Nam

People 
 Wedo Georgetti (1911–2005), American artist
 Wedo Martini (1913–1970), American baseball player